Nikos Tzimogiannis (born 17 November 1987) is a Greek footballer who currently plays in Greek second division for Panegialios F.C.

Honours

Veria F.C.
Football League: Runner-up: 2011-12
Football League 2: 2009-10

References

External links
 

1987 births
Living people
Footballers from Veria
Greek footballers
Veria F.C. players
Panegialios F.C. players
Association football defenders